Hacıali can refer to the following villages in Turkey:

 Hacıali, Ardahan
 Hacıali, Manavgat
 Hacıali, Taşköprü
 Hacıali, Yüreğir
 Hacıali, Zonguldak